The Kamuku languages are a branch of the Kainji languages spoken by the Kamuku people of Niger State, western Nigeria, mostly in Mariga and Rafi LGAs.

Although formerly classified as Kamuku, Pongu is now placed in a related branch, the Pongu (Shiroro) languages, and Western Acipa (Cipu) with the Kambari languages.

Languages

Blench (2012)
Blench (2012) lists the following Kamuku languages and their sociolinguistic situations. Kamuku internal classification can be briefly summarised as:

Proto-Kamuku
Hungwəryə
Core Kamuku (‘Yara)
Cinda-Regi: Cinda, Regi-Shiyabe, Orogo, Kuki; Kuru-Maruba
Səgəmuk (Zubazuba); Sama-Sambuga
Kagare
Rogo II

‘Yara, or Cinda-Regi-Kuki-Kuru-Maruba, is the largest Kamuku subgroup. There are four main Cinda-Regi varieties, Cinda, Regi, Orogo, and Kuki. Kuru and Maruba, both named after villages, are close to each other. Shiyabe is close to tuRogo. However, Rogo can refer to two varieties, namely a Cinda-Regi variety and another non-Cinda-Regi variety (Rogo II). Səgəmuk (Zubazuba), Tushyabe, and Turubaruba are all spoken in Igwama town of Mariga LGA, Niger State.

Kagare (Kwagere) is spoken in Unguwar Tanko village. There is partial intelligibility with Cinda, Regi and Səgəmuk (Zubazuba).

Names for various Kamuku languages:

Extinct languages
Extinct Kamuku languages:

Sambuga (extinct) and Shama (still spoken) are closely related.
Makɨci (? [məkɨci]) was an extinct Kamuku language spoken in Makɨci village and in a village cluster a few kilometres east of Igwama.
Ingwai (Inkwai) is extinct.
The village of Saya may have also spoken a Kamuku language. Ingwai and Saya speakers have both switched to Hausa.
Kwacika (extinct) is reported to be a Kamuku language.

Blench (2018)
Kamuku classification by Blench (2018):

Kamuku
Hungwəryə
Core Kamuku (‘Yara)
Sama-Sambuga (extinct)
Makici (extinct)
Zubazuba
Inkwai (extinct)
Regi, Kuki, Rogo-Shyabe
Cinda cluster

Each lect is generally identified with an individual hill in the Mariga area of Niger State.

See also
Pongu languages, also known as Kamuku languages

References

Further reading
Sociolinguistic survey (level one) of the Kamuku language cluster

External links 
 Roger Blench, Kamuku languages

 
Kainji languages